Spilonota albicana, the white fruit moth, larger apple fruit moth or eye-spotted bud moth, is a species of moth of the  family Tortricidae. It is found in China (Tianjin, Hebei, Heilongjiang, Zhejiang, Fujian, Henan, Hubei, Hunan, Sichuan, Guizhou, Shaanxi, Gansu), Korea, Japan (Hokkaido, Honshu) and Russia (Transbaikalia, Russian Far East). It has been accidentally introduced in the Netherlands.

The wingspan is 13–15 mm. The forewings are albescent (whitish), with greyish crosslines at the base and along the anterior margin. The hindwings are grey. Adults are on wing from mid-May to June and from mid-July to the end of August in two generations per year.

The larvae feed on Malus pumila, Malus sieboldii, Malus mandshurica, Malus pallasiana, Photinia glabra, Pyrus species, Armeniaca vulgaris, Amygdalus persica, Prunus salicina, Prunus serrulata var. spontanea, Cerasus pseudocerasus, Cerasus tomentosa, Cotoneaster melanocarpus, Crataegus pinnatifida, Crataegus dahurica, Crataegus maximowiczii, Sorbus amurensis, Larix leptolepis, Larix gmelini and Corylus heterophylla. They feed on the leaves, buds, flowers and ovaries of their host plant. The larvae have a dirty-grey body. They reach a length of 15–18 mm. The species overwinters as a full-grown larva in a white cocoon made within bark crevices in leaf litter or in the surface layer of the ground.

References

Moths described in 1866
Eucosmini